Gabal Edmonstone is a flat-topped mesa located near the Dakhla Oasis south of Cairo, Egypt. The flat caprock of both the scarp and Mount Edmonstone is chalky limestone underlain by fossil-bearing shale and fine-grained sedimentary rocks.

References

Mountains of Egypt
Mesas